Tibor Frešo (20 November 1918 – 7 July 1987) was a Slovak composer and conductor.

Frešo was born in Spišský Štiavnik.  He conducted the orchestra of the Slovak National Theatre as well as the Slovak Philharmonic.  He died in Piešťany.

External links

 
 Biography and list of works

1918 births
1987 deaths
Slovak composers
Male composers
Slovak conductors (music)
Male conductors (music)
20th-century composers
People from Poprad District
20th-century conductors (music)
20th-century male musicians
Slovak male musicians